Botulino is a rural locality (a village) in Denisovskoye Rural Settlement, Gorokhovetsky District, Vladimir Oblast, Russia. The population was 7 as of 2010.

Geography 
Botulino is located near the Klyazma River, 30 km west of Gorokhovets (the district's administrative centre) by road. Tarkhanovo is the nearest rural locality.

References 

Rural localities in Gorokhovetsky District